Rijnmond (literally Rhine Mouth, Mouth of the Rhine, Rhine Estuary) is the conurbation surrounding the city of Rotterdam in the Netherlands. Another term used in this context is Stadsregio Rotterdam (literally Rotterdam Urban Region or more conventionally Greater Rotterdam Area). Located on the Rhine–Meuse–Scheldt delta, the region has a combined population of 1,242,378 as of 2016.

The term Rijnmond is used in the security region Rotterdam-Rijnmond, it exists out of the following municipalities: Albrandswaard, Barendrecht, Brielle, Capelle aan den IJssel, Goeree-Overflakkee, Hellevoetsluis, Krimpen aan den IJssel, Lansingerland, Maassluis, Nissewaard, Ridderkerk, Rotterdam, Schiedam, Vlaardingen en Westvoorne.

Number of inhabitants per municipality

See also 
 Zuid-Holland Oost
 Zuid-Holland West
 Zuid-Holland Zuid

References

External links 
  Rijnmond, Province of South Holland

Metropolitan areas of the Netherlands
Regions of the Netherlands
Regions of South Holland